Akila may refer to:

Places
Acila or Ocelis, an ancient town in Yemen

People
Akila Dananjaya (born 1993), Sri Lankan cricketer
Akila Ellawala (born 1976), Sri Lankan politician
Akila Isanka (born 1989), Sri Lankan cricketer
Akila Jayasundera (born 1992), Sri Lankan cricketer
Akila Viraj Kariyawasam (born 1973), Sri Lankan politician 
Akila Lakshan (born 1995), Sri Lankan cricketer
Akila Radhakrishnan (born 1982), American lawyer

See also

Abila (disambiguation)
Aila (name)
Akela (disambiguation)
Akhila
Akiba (disambiguation)
Akil (disambiguation)
Akilah (disambiguation)
Akilam
Akilan
Akina (given name)
Akira (disambiguation)
Akita (disambiguation)
Akiva (disambiguation)
Anila (disambiguation)
Ávila (disambiguation)
Akeelah and the Bee

Sinhalese masculine given names